WBIH (channel 29) is a religious television station licensed to Selma, Alabama, United States, serving the Montgomery area as an owned-and-operated station of Tri-State Christian Television (TCT). The station's transmitter is located in unincorporated western Autauga County.

History

The station was founded in 2001.

On May 28, 2020, Flinn Broadcasting Corporation announced that it would sell WBIH, along with sister stations KCWV in Duluth, Minnesota, WWJX in Jackson, Mississippi, and WFBD in Destin, Florida, to Marion, Illinois-based Tri-State Christian Television for an undisclosed price. The sale was completed on September 15; the stations became owned-and-operated stations of the TCT network two days later, with WBIH becoming the second religious television station in the Montgomery area. (Religious programming has been first offered by WMCF-TV when that station switched to the Trinity Broadcasting Network in 1986.)

Technical information

Subchannels
The station's digital signal is multiplexed:

Analog-to-digital conversion
WBIH shut down its analog signal, over UHF channel 29, on May 22, 2006. The station "flash-cut" its digital signal into operation UHF channel 29. Because it was granted an original construction permit after the FCC finalized the DTV allotment plan on April 21, 1997. The station did not receive a companion channel for a digital television station.

References

External links

Tri-State Christian Television affiliates
Selma, Alabama
Television channels and stations established in 2001
BIH
2001 establishments in Alabama